The Immigration Department of Malaysia is a department of the Malaysian federal government that provides services to Malaysian citizens, permanent residents and foreign visitors. The department is responsible for issuing passports, travel documents, visas, passes and permits; administering and managing the movement of people at authorised entry and exit points; and enforcing immigration legislation including the Immigration Act 1959/63 and the Passport Act 1966. The department is a section of the Ministry of Home Affairs.

History
In the early years before World War II, the Immigration Department conducted surveillance and inspection work involving the inspection of travellers and travel documents at entry points.

Immigration matters were administered by a Senior Officer of the Malayan Civil Service who bore the title of "Immigration Officer of the Straits Settlement and Federated Malay States". He was assisted by the Deputy Immigration Officer, who was actually a police officer, temporarily seconded to the post. They were based in Penang which was the main entry point into Malaya. Other entry points were Changloon, Padang Besar, Kroh and Port Swettenham. The administrative centre was based in Singapore.

After World War II, the Immigration Department was known as The Refugees and Disposal Persons Bureau which was based in Kuala Lumpur and led by a British Military Administration Officer. Its main role was to bring people stranded in other countries due to World War II back to Malaysia.

The first immigration law was the Passenger Restriction Ordinance 1922, which was enforced on 21 July 1922 to regulate entries into this country. In 1930, the Aliens Immigration Restriction Ordinance was enacted to regulate the arrivals and to monitor the labourers especially those from China where the quota system was used. A review of the law was done as a step to increase the control. The Aliens Ordinance 1932 took effect on 1 April 1933.

A treaty on the formation of Federated Malay States and the Declaration of Emergency in 1948 led to a better Immigration and Passport Law which comprises the following:

 The Emergency (Travel Restriction) Regulation 1948
 The Passport Ordinance 1949
 The Passport Regulations 1949
 The Emergency (Entry By Land From Thailand) Regulations 1949

The immigration laws used during the State of Emergency were replaced by The Immigration Ordinance 1952. It became the main immigration law used to regulate and monitor the entries of all British nationals, people under the British colony and 'aliens' to the Federated Malay States. The law was also enforced in Singapore.

The Immigration Department was then placed under the administration of the Ministry of Foreign Affairs. Besides being responsible for the control of entry, the Immigration Department was also responsible for the:

 Issuing of passports at the passport issuing offices in Singapore, Penang, Residents' Offices and the office of the British advisor
 Issuance of visas and citizenship applications for Commonwealth countries on behalf of the British government

After independence, The Immigration Ordinance 1959, The Immigration Regulations 1959 and The Passport Ordinance 1960 were introduced to replace The Immigration Ordinance 1949. These laws provided greater power for regulating the entry of foreigners and visitors into the Federated Malay States.

The formation of Malaysia in 1963 had extended the immigration requirements to the states of Sabah and Sarawak. The Immigration (Transitional Provisions) Act 1963 was enacted to protect the interests of both States. Apart from regulating and controlling the entry and exit of non citizens, the Sabah and Sarawak's immigration office also controlled the entry of Malaysian citizens originating from Peninsular Malaysia (West Malaysia).

In 1964, the management of immigration matters was placed under the Ministry of Home Affairs. The administration was handed over to a Malaysian. Mr. Ibrahim bin Ali was appointed as the first National Immigration Controller. The appointment took place on 1 January 1967. Starting from 13 April 1965, the immigration head office was located at Jalan Tugu, Kuala Lumpur.

On 1 December 1971, immigration administrative matters of the Malay States came under the Malaysian Immigration Headquarters. The immigration laws enforced at that time were reviewed and in 1974, a special provision for the states of Sabah and Sarawak was included. The Immigration Act 1959/63 (Act No. 155) and the Passport Act 1966 (Act No. 150) were used nationwide. These Acts were revised and amended from time to time according to the current situation and need. The title, Immigration Controller was replaced with the Director General of Immigration in 1969.

Since its establishment in 1947, the Headquarters of the Immigration Department of Malaysia was in Penang. On 13 April 1965, the Immigration Headquarters was transferred to Jalan Tugu, Kuala Lumpur. In January 1981, the office moved to BUKOTA Building, Jalan Pantai Baharu, Kuala Lumpur, before moving to Pusat Bandar Damansara, Kuala Lumpur in 1988. Now, the headquarters of the Immigration Department of Malaysia are located at Putrajaya. The move of premises started in September 2004 and it was done in stages to ensure that the quality of services to the public was maintained.

History of corruption
The Immigration Department of Malaysia has a longstanding history of corruption, allowing for threats of terrorism and human trafficking to become significant problems for the country. Despite the Malaysian government's desire to promote an image of Malaysia as a progressive nation, widespread abuses of immigration controls since at least the 2000s have sullied that image. In 2017, government minister Datuk Seri Idris Haron named the Department of Immigration in Malacca as the most corrupt civil service department in the state. After being promoted as head of Malaysia's Department of Immigration in 2017, Datuk Seri Mustafar Ali revealed that an internal audit and an investigation by the Malaysian Anti-Corruption Commission (MACC) had uncovered a passport fraud scheme being committed by officers in Selangor since 2014 that, according to MACC deputy commissioner Datuk Azam Baki, "could be happening at most Immigration offices nationwide." In 2016, massive corruption was discovered involving the disabling of the national electronic security system at Malaysia's international airports by immigration officers profiting from bribes by human trafficking syndicates to allow illegal passage of migrants into the country, raising questions about the system's effectiveness at keeping terrorists from streaming into Malaysia.

In late February 2021, the Immigration Department drew criticism from Amnesty International and Asylum Access for deporting 1,086 Myanmar nationals despite an interim ruling by the Kuala Lumpur High Court suspending the removal of some 1,200 people. The 1,086 Myanmar nationals were repatriated on three Myanmar Navy ships. This deportation came amidst human rights concerns following the 2021 Myanmar coup d'état.

Uniforms
Since the 1960s, immigration officials use white uniform and dark blue uniform color. In early 2013 a new color uniform immigration officers have been converted to black overall. Features new uniforms are black beret, badge over the left shoulder and right, tags and badges on the chest to the right service. They have also introduced digital uniforms for enforcement duties and tasks in the immigration detention centre. The need to change uniforms was deemed necessary as the previous white and dark blue uniforms have remained in service since the 1960s. In addition, the application ranks were changed to avoid confusion with the ranks of other agencies.

Weaponry and equipment
Hiatt speedcuffs, T-baton, LED flashlight, riot shields, helmets and walkie-talkies are supplied to the officer when on duty to enforce immigration law. The need for better weapons is necessary to ensure the safety of officers during the operation and control of detainees in immigration detention.

The Department of Immigration bear firearms, but not all immigration officers are supplied with them. Immigration officers are licensed by the particular State Immigration Director to carry firearms in the possession of immigration like the standard issued ones:

Reported that Immigration only have 190 of them carry firearms, compare to their 14,000 personnel. Immigration officers also not supplied with rifles, SMGs and carbines. 
There is no indication that immigration will use better weapons with better firepower such as those used by Royal Malaysia Police, Malaysia Anti Corruption Commission, Royal Malaysian Customs or Malaysian Prison Department. However, as of 2014 the need for superior weapons and better equipment were planned.

Immigration Detention Centre
Immigrants who commit offenses will be held in immigration detention facilities are located in every state in Malaysia to further investigation and repatriation to the country of origin. Detention overcrowding in detention centres across the country and dilapidated buildings has resulted in efforts to combat the problem of illegal immigrants to be difficult. The problem is being resolved by upgrading detention and detention capacity. Congestion also due to documentation problems involved countries and UNHCR refugees. Immigration officers working in detention centres receive training tactics and techniques to control prisoners, unarmed combat, training T-baton and so by certified trainers from within and outside the department. Immigration Department has also set up a special anti-riot team known as the "Pasukan Kawalan Khas".MESBEH AR686139

Pasukan Kawalan Khas
Immigration Department introduced the Special Control Team, which was created to address the threat situation, the riot of illegal immigrants in the depot and the accompanying department officials and other VIPs. It is an elite team and first trained immigration training modules of the Federal Reserve Unit (FRU) of the Royal Malaysia Police (RMP). Students who practiced the team is divided into two, namely Prevent Riots and Close Quarter Battle (CQB) skills, martial arts and unarmed combat situations or dangerous and high-risk operations. The team is undergoing training under the supervision of teaching staff is made up of a mix of professional trainers who commissioned from abroad, a former police trainer and former FRU trainers. The team who received the anti-riot training and the skills to use the T- baton, handcuffs and spray tear from qualified experts concerned. The team is equipped with digital uniform and gun last for setting up of any unexpected situations occur. The Bravo platoon was assigned as teams Tandem control involving dignitaries who faced a high risk situation either from the department or the department yet. For example, the service is required to accompany the team superiors and operations department following the terrorist attack is likely.

In popular culture 
Gerak Khas season 18 (2018) cooperation with Skop Production and Royal Malaysia Police which one of the episodes about operation against Human trafficking and murder Immigration officer

References

External links
 

Immigration
Malaysia
Immigration to Malaysia
Ministry of Home Affairs (Malaysia)